Jack Boyle (born 24 March 1996) is a New Zealand cricketer. He made his first-class debut for Canterbury on 22 November 2016 in the 2016–17 Plunket Shield season. He made his List A debut for Canterbury on 15 January 2017 in the 2016–17 Ford Trophy.

In October 2018, he scored his maiden century in first-class cricket, batting for Canterbury against Northern Districts in the 2018–19 Plunket Shield season. He made his Twenty20 debut on 15 December 2019, for Canterbury in the 2019–20 Super Smash.

In June 2020, he was offered a contract by Canterbury ahead of the 2020–21 domestic cricket season.

References

External links
 

1996 births
Living people
New Zealand cricketers
Canterbury cricketers
Cricketers from Christchurch